Ali Pasha Mosque was constructed in Sarajevo, Bosnia and Herzegovina during 1560–61 as a vakıf—the legacy or perpetual endowment—of Sofu Hadım Ali Pasha, an Ottoman statesman who served as the governor of the Bosnia Eyalet of the Ottoman Empire amongst other roles, after his death in September 1560.

Description 
The mosque was built according to the classical Ottoman architectural style. A dome covers the prayer area and three smaller domes cover the cloister. Its proportions make it the largest sub-dome mosque in Bosnia and Herzegovina. The grounds of the complex contain a mausoleum with two sarcophagi—those of Avdo Sumbul and Behdžet Mutevelić, Gajret activists who died in the dungeons of Arad. The Ali Pasha Mosque was heavily damaged by Serbian forces during the Bosnian War of the early 1990s, especially the dome. The most recent renovation of the mosque occurred in 2004 and in January 2005, the Commission to Preserve National Monuments issued a decision to add the Ali Pasha Mosque to the list of National Monuments of Bosnia and Herzegovina.

See also
 Islam in Bosnia and Herzegovina
 List of mosques in Bosnia and Herzegovina

References

Mosques in Sarajevo
Religious buildings and structures completed in 1561
Centar, Sarajevo
Attacks on religious buildings and structures during the Bosnian War
Ottoman mosques in Bosnia and Herzegovina
16th-century mosques
National Monuments of Bosnia and Herzegovina
1561 establishments in the Ottoman Empire
Medieval Bosnia and Herzegovina architecture